Beth Israel Deaconess Hospital- Plymouth (BID-Plymouth) is a hospital located in Plymouth, Massachusetts. Founded in 1901, it is today the largest hospital in the Southern region of the South Shore. BID-Plymouth is an acute care, 164-bed, not-for-profit community hospital serving 12 towns in Plymouth and Barnstable counties. It contains more than 30 departments, programs and services, including chiropractic care.

The hospital gained its original name of Jordan Hospital due to a $20,000 (equivalent to $ in today's dollars) donation by resident Eben Jordan. In January 2014, Jordan Hospital joined the Beth Israel Deaconess Medical Center family of hospitals and became Beth Israel Deaconess Hospital-Plymouth.

Distinction
Leapfrog Top Hospital, 2016 and 2017.
Leapfrog A-Rated Hospital for Quality.
CMS 4-Star Quality Rated Hospital

References

External links

 Beth Israel Deaconess Hospital- Plymouth Website

Buildings and structures in Plymouth, Massachusetts
Hospital buildings completed in 1901
Hospitals in Plymouth County, Massachusetts